Dental Historian is the official journal of The Lindsay Society for the History of Dentistry, published twice a year and free to the society's members. It was originally established as the Occasional Newsletter in the 1970s, acquiring its current name in 1985. The journal is included in the Scopus database.

References 

Dentistry journals
Biannual journals
English-language journals
Publications with year of establishment missing
History of medicine journals